Donna Preston (born 6 June 1986) is an English actress, comedian and writer, notable for appearances in Apocalypse Wow, Hey Tracey! and Michael McIntyre's Big Show. She appears as Despair in Neil Gaiman's The Sandman released on Netflix in 2022.

Early life and education 
Preston was born on 6 June 1986 in York, North Yorkshire and went to Fulford School in York. She attended York college and went on to train at Rose Bruford in London.

Career 
Preston has appeared in a number of films and television series. Film work includes Set the Thames on Fire (starring Noel Fielding), Grimsby (starring Sacha Baron Cohen), The Hitman's Bodyguard (starring Ryan Reynolds and Samuel L. Jackson) and Holmes & Watson (starring Will Ferrell and John C. Reilly). She has also regularly lent her voice to the Discovery Channel, BBC, ITV, E4, Amazon and Channel 4.

In 2018, she appeared in Coronation Street, Fantastic Beasts: The Crimes of Grindelwald, and took a lead role in Michael McIntyre's Big Show executing pranks involving improvisation on the general public.

In 2019, she appeared on Pants on Fire on E4. Preston wrote and co-produced the series Fully Blown for BBC Three's Comedy Threesomes, transmitted in 2019, which was nominated for a Broadcast Digital Award 2020. From 2019 to 2020, Preston starred as Tracey in Hey Tracey! on ITV2, alongside Joel Dommett, and appeared in episodes of The Mash Report on BBC Two. She has appeared in a number of online comedy sketches for Channel 4.

In 2020, she appeared in episodes of BBC Three's Famalam and the feature film Loves Spell. That year she was also shortlisted for the Funny Women Awards 2020, and was a guest on 8 Out of 10 Cats on Channel 4.

In 2021, she guest starred on Inside No. 9, and co-hosted ITV's Apocalypse Wow!. She appeared as herself on Sky One's Dating NoFilter, CelebAbility, and Strictly Come Dancing: It Takes Two. During the same year, she was nominated for two Channel 4 National Comedy Awards, for Outstanding Female Comedy Entertainment Performance and the Comedy Breakthrough Award.

In 2022, she appeared as Despair in Neil Gaiman's fantasy drama The Sandman and as Pat in Catherine Tate's six-part mockumentary sitcom Hard Cell, both released on Netflix.

Filmography

Film

Television

References

External links 

 

Living people
21st-century British actresses
21st-century British comedians
21st-century English actresses
21st-century English comedians
Actresses from York
English film actresses
English television actresses
English women comedians
1986 births